Four French scientists with the same Friedel family name are in direct lineage, Charles, Georges, Edmond and Jacques:

 Charles Friedel (1832–1899), French chemist known for the Friedel-Crafts reaction
 Georges Friedel (1865–1933), French crystallographer and mineralogist; son of Charles
 Edmond Friedel (1895–1972), French polytechnician and mining engineer, founder of BRGM, the French geological survey; son of Georges
 Jacques Friedel, (1921–2014), French physicist; son of Edmond, see the French site for Jacques Friedel

Related items
 Friedel–Crafts reaction, a type of organic reaction developed by Charles Friedel and James Crafts in 1877.
 Friedel's law, named after Georges Friedel, the crystallographer, is a property of Fourier transforms of real functions. 
 Friedel's salt, discovered by Georges Friedel, is an anion exchanger mineral belonging to the family of the layered double hydroxides (LDHs).

References

French families